is a 1959 Japanese drama film directed by Satsuo Yamamoto. It was written by Yoshikata Yoda, based on a novel by activist Tomoe Yamashiro.

Plot
In Hiroshima Prefecture during the Meiji era, simple housemaid Seki accepts the proposal of Moichi, an educated mail carrier, who has decided to quit his job and save money for a warehouse by transporting goods with his wooden cart. Seki's parents disown her for not asking for their approval, and also Moichi's mother, a widow, does not accept her as her daughter-in-law, treating her disdainfully. The couple borrows money for a second cart, and Seki joins her husband in his hard labour life. The film follows Seki through familial and financial difficulties and her raising five children over the next 50 years, and ends with the post-war agrarian reform.

Cast
 Yūko Mochizuki as Seki
 Rentarō Mikuni as Moichi
 Teruko Kishi as Moichi's mother
 Sachiko Hidari as Otoyo
 Mitsuko Mito as Natsuno
 Kō Nishimura as Hatsuzo
 Yoshio Inaba as Fujitaro	
 Eitarō Ozawa as Seki's employer
 Kumeko Urabe as Ohina

Production
The production of Ballad of the Cart was funded with the help of Japan's National Association of Women Farmers and produced by the National Rural Film Association. Screenwriter Yoshikata Yoda, a frequent collaborator of director Kenji Mizoguchi, adapted Tomoe Yamashiro's 1956 novel of the same name, a notable post-war example of Japanese "peasant literature".

Release
The film was released cinematically in Japan on February 11, 1959 by Shintoho. It was later released on DVD in 2004.

Awards
Ballad of the Cart received awards for Best Director (Yamamoto) and Best Film Score (Hikaru Hayashi) at the 1960 Mainichi Film Awards.

In Kinema Junpo magazine's list of the 10 best Japanese films of the year, Ballad of the Cart reached #4 in 1959.

Reception
Film scholar Alexander Jacoby pointed out the film's depth of characterisation and intelligent script, calling it "exceptionally moving" and "probably Yamamoto's masterpiece".

References

External links
 

1959 films
1959 drama films
Japanese drama films
Japanese black-and-white films
Films based on Japanese novels
Social realism in film
Films set in Hiroshima Prefecture
Films directed by Satsuo Yamamoto
1950s Japanese films